The Borough of Harrogate is a local government district with borough status in North Yorkshire, England. Its population at the census of 2011 was 157,869. Its council is based in the town of Harrogate, but it also includes surrounding towns and villages. This includes the cathedral city of Ripon and almost all of the Nidderdale Area of Outstanding Natural Beauty. 

The district was formed on 1 April 1974, under the Local Government Act 1972, as a merger of the Masham and Wath rural districts, and part of Thirsk, from the North Riding of Yorkshire, along with the boroughs of Harrogate and the city of Ripon, the Knaresborough urban district, Nidderdale Rural District, Ripon and Pateley Bridge Rural District, part of Wetherby Rural District and part of Wharfedale Rural District, all in the West Riding of Yorkshire.

The district is part of the Leeds City Region, and borders seven other areas; the Craven, Richmondshire, Hambleton, Selby and York districts in North Yorkshire and the boroughs of Bradford and Leeds in West Yorkshire. It falls primarily within the HG, LS and YO postcode areas, while a small part of it is within the BD area.

It is the county's fourth largest district, as well the seventh largest non-metropolitan district in England. It was previously the county's second largest district until 1 April 1996, when the parishes of Nether Poppleton, Upper Poppleton, Hessay and Rufforth were transferred from the Borough of Harrogate to become part of the newly formed York unitary authority.  According to the 2001 census, these parishes had a population of 5,169.

Politics

Elections to the borough council are held in three out of every four years, with one third of the 54 seats on the council being elected at each election. After being under no overall control from the 2006 election, the Conservative party gained a majority at the 2010 election.

Following the 2016 United Kingdom local elections and subsequent by-elections, the political composition of Harrogate is as follows:

This was the last composition of the former 54 seat council, prior to boundary changes.

The current composition of the new 40 seat council after boundary changes is as follows:

Abolition 
In July 2021 the Ministry of Housing, Communities and Local Government announced that in April 2023, the non-metropolitan county will be reorganised into a unitary authority.  Harrogate Borough Council will be abolished and its functions transferred to a new single authority for the non-metropolitan county of North Yorkshire.

Parliamentary constituencies 
The district is divided between three parliamentary constituencies: the whole of Harrogate and Knaresborough, the eastern part of Skipton and Ripon and the north western part of Selby and Ainsty.

Towns
By population:  1. Harrogate  2. Ripon (city)  3. Knaresborough  4. Boroughbridge  5. Pateley Bridge  6. Masham

Historical sites
Aldborough Roman Museum
Fountains Abbey
Ripon Cathedral
Knaresborough Castle
Ripley Castle
Spofforth Castle
Marston Moor
Devil's Arrows

Freedom of the Borough
The following people and military units have received the Freedom of the Borough of Harrogate.

Individuals
 David Simpson (1860–1931), the first honorary freeman of the Borough of Harrogate, in 1923.
 Rt Hon Lord Halifax : 1926.
 Jonathan Wild: 18 July 2012.
 Jean MacQuarrie: October 2021.

Military units
 The Army Foundation College.

References

 
Non-metropolitan districts of North Yorkshire
Boroughs in England
Leeds City Region